The 1930 Saxony state election was held on 22 June 1930 to elect the 96 members of the Landtag of Saxony.

Results

References 

Saxony
Elections in Saxony
June 1930 events